The Fist of God is a 1994 suspense novel by British writer Frederick Forsyth, with a fictitious retelling of the Iraqi Project Babylon and the resulting "supergun".

Featuring a story set during the Persian Gulf War, the novel details an Allied effort to find the suspected Iraqi nuclear weapon. The story features the brothers Mike and Terry Martin who also appear in Forsyth's 2006 novel The Afghan.

Plot
Dr. Gerald Bull designs a supergun codenamed Project Babylon for Iraq. He believes that it is for launching satellites into space and assumes it could serve no military purpose for a few reasons: firstly, it cannot traverse from side to side, nor alter its angle of elevation or depression; secondly, it would have to be completely disassembled and reassembled to change targets, and lastly, it could fire only once before being located and destroyed. He comes to discover the true reason only shortly before being assassinated by his paymasters, though his death is variously blamed by the media on the Mossad, the Central Intelligence Agency, or any one of numerous other intelligence organisations.

Iraq subsequently invades Kuwait, leading the British and Americans to require top-level intelligence on the ground. Major Mike Martin of the Special Air Service (SAS) is seconded to SIS to collaborate with the Kuwaiti resistance. Not only does Major Martin speak fluent Arabic, but with his black hair and dark complexion, he can practically pass for an Arab. His brother, Terry, an expert in Arab military studies, works with the Medusa Committee, a joint British-American panel investigating Iraq's weapons of mass destruction.

The CIA and SIS do not have any assets deep inside the Iraqi government and the Mossad also initially deny they have any active agents within Iraq. However, they are forced later to admit they have an unidentified top agent, codenamed "Jericho", whom they have been paying for information on the Iraqi military and government through an account in Vienna, but from whom they have not heard since the invasion began. Because Israel is forced to stay out of the war to prevent alienating Arab countries in the Coalition, they agree to let the Americans run Jericho, if they can find him. Mike Martin is recalled from Kuwait and sent into Iraq to run Jericho through a series of dead drops while working a cover job as a house gardener for the Soviet Union's First Secretary to the Soviet Embassy in Bagdad.

The Medusa Committee concludes that Iraq's biological weapons capability is not a threat and, despite possessing a plentiful supply of yellowcake, it's had insufficient time with its limited underground gas centrifuges to produce the weapons-grade uranium-235 to make an atomic bomb. They decide that gas is the real danger, and the Americans make an unequivocal threat to the Iraqi government to retaliate and attack Baghdad with nuclear weapons should gas be used. However, an over-zealous American F-15E pilot, frustrated at an aborted bombing run, drops his bombs on a building unlisted on his target list and reconnaissance photographs reveal strange large metal discs underneath the roof. Terry Martin takes the photographs to Lawrence Livermore National Laboratory in California to see if they can identify the discs, where a retired Manhattan Project employee identifies the discs as Calutrons (California Cyclotrons), a low-tech solution to refining uranium, ideal for Third World nations wanting to develop their own nuclear capability, and subsequently determines that had Iraq used them in conjunction with their existing centrifuges, they could have made a nuclear bomb already.

Jericho reveals the location of a factory where such a bomb was put together and it is destroyed; however, he later reports that the weapon had been moved hours prior to a new site, a place called the "Qa'ala" (Fortress). Despite the $5 million already paid him, Major Martin offers him $3 million more to expose the bomb's new location. The Americans nonetheless remain highly skeptical because such a bomb would be too heavy to attach to a Scud missile and the Coalition's air supremacy would prevent a plane from getting close enough to drop it. In order to bypass both these problems, Iraq's solution is a supergun, hidden in a classified location, designed to fire the atomic weapon, called "The Fist of God", into Saudi Arabia should the Coalition begin the ground phase of Desert Storm, which would kill approximately 100,000 soldiers, and the consequent radioactive fallout will be carried into Iran.

Jericho next reports the cannon's location to be somewhere in the Jebal al-Hamreen mountains in eastern Iraq (after torturing the project's lead engineer). Major Martin, who narrowly escapes capture by Iraqi counter-intelligence for transmitting Jericho's messages to his own handlers, decides to leave Iraq. Safely recovered across the border, Mike volunteers to HALO jump with a British SAS team into Iraq to destroy the cannon. The Americans agree to delay the invasion by two days, citing weather conditions as the reason. The SAS squad designates the target and a lone U.S. Air Force F-15E carpet bombs the mountain range, destroying the super-weapon. General Norman Schwarzkopf is told the mission has been successful and orders the land invasion of Kuwait to commence.

Because of the pressure on the Israelis to admit Jericho's existence, the Mossad executes "Operation Joshua", an attempt to infiltrate the Viennese bank holding Jericho's account and seize the money. An agent's seduction of the bank manager's secretary along with the assistance from Jewish diaspora such as Sayanim, helps the Mossad access and photograph the details of the Jericho account, allowing the Israeli government to recover the entire reward rendered to Jericho. The secretary, Edith Hardenberg, eventually commits suicide when she realized that her "lover" had used her to obtain the information. Jericho – who turns out to be AMAM director Brigadier Omar Khatib (also known as "The Tormentor")  – is picked up by Mossad agents masquerading as American military intelligence agents, flown out of Iraq, drugged, and his body thrown into the sea from 10,000 feet.

Subplots
Aside from the main plot involving Martin and the Mossad operation in Vienna, there are other subplots that eventually tie themselves into the story. These include a prostitute servicing the commander of Iraq's armoured forces who is also a spy for the Iraqi counter-intelligence head, the backgrounds of an Iraqi Air Force pilot and his brother, the chief of Iraq's counter-intelligence, and the USAF pilot who bombs the Iraqi factory. The Iraqi Air Force pilot, his brother, and the Iraqi counter-intelligence head are revealed to be former elementary school classmates of the Martin brothers.

Connection with other Forsyth books
The characters of Fist re-appear or are referenced in two other of Forsyth's novels:
Tim Nathanson, the weapons systems officer of the Strike Eagle pilot who bombed the Iraqi factory and the Qa'ala, is the son of top American banker Saul Nathanson. He dies after the climax of the book. The elder Nathanson reflects on his son's death in Icon.
The Martin brothers later appear in The Afghan.
In his previous novel, The Deceiver, Forsyth depicts the "trial" of a middle-aged S.I.S. operative who is regarded as an anachronistic "menace" by his younger, politicking superior.  The operative's private opinion of his superior is that he, and too many others like him in the S.I.S., are over-awed by the C.I.A.'s use of technology (Sigint and satellite photography), and foolishly regard humint (human agents) as a thing of the past.  In The Fist of God, Forsyth paints several comical scenes in which the C.I.A. and U.S. military realize that they have enough satellite photos and signal intercepts "to drown in," yet none of it offers any insight into the Iraqis' true intentions, and they begin searching desperately for a way to infiltrate Saddam Hussein's regime with a living agent.
In his afterword to The Fist of God, Forsyth makes his point explicit, that HUMINT will always be a necessary part of espionage.

Background
Set against the backdrop of the Gulf War, the novel features several real-life characters central to the conflict. The assassination of Gerald Bull is central to the novel.

Historical characters
American:
George Bush – U.S. President
James Baker – Secretary of State
Brent Scowcroft – head, National Security Council
Norman Schwarzkopf – commander, Coalition Forces
Chuck Horner – commander, Coalition air forces

Canadian:
Gerald Bull – Engineer of the supergun

British:
Margaret Thatcher – British Prime Minister
Gen. Sir Peter de la Billière – commander, British Forces
John Major – Chancellor of the Exchequer

In the novel, a British Tornado aircraft is shot down while on a bombing mission. The pilot and navigator are named "Peter Johns" and "Nicky Tyne" - these are references to John Peters and John Nichol (from Tyneside), the crew of an actual Tornado raid which was downed over Iraq during the Gulf War.

Iraqi:
Saddam Hussein – President
Tariq Aziz – Foreign Minister
Izzat Ibrahim – Deputy President
Taha Ramadam – Prime Minister
Sadoun Hammadi – Deputy Premier

Israeli:
Yitzhak Shamir – Prime Minister
Benjamin Netanyahu – Deputy Foreign Minister

Critical reception
The novel received good reviews.

Kirkus Reviews cited the novel has enough material to satisfy espionage thriller fans with its believability about what may have happened behind the scenes of the Gulf War.

People claimed the novel packs "derring-do entertainment with a political message."

Publishers Weekly lauded the novel for fusing historical facts into a gripping what-if thriller.

References

Novels by Frederick Forsyth
1994 British novels
Gulf War fiction
Novels set in Iraq
Novels set in Kuwait
Novels set in Saudi Arabia
Novels set in London
Novels set in California
Bantam Books books